K is a 2002 film directed by Iranian American multimedia artist Shoja Azari, based on three short stories by Franz Kafka - "The Married Couple," "In the Penal Colony" and "A Fratricide." - which are all performed by the same group of actors.

External links

2002 films
2002 drama films
Films based on multiple works
Films based on short fiction
Films based on works by Franz Kafka
American drama films
2000s English-language films
2000s American films